Events from the year 1996 in the United Arab Emirates.

Incumbents
President: Zayed bin Sultan Al Nahyan 
Prime Minister: Maktoum bin Rashid Al Maktoum

Events

1996 Dubai World Cup
United Arab Emirates at the 1996 Summer Olympics

References

 
Years of the 20th century in the United Arab Emirates
United Arab Emirates
United Arab Emirates
1990s in the United Arab Emirates